Venezuelan artist Mateo Manaure was commissioned to create pieces for the University City of Caracas. 
 
Manaure has a reported 26 pieces of work on the campus. Though his pieces are mostly ceramic murals, he also created wooden acoustic frames and stained-glass windows. Most were completed in the 1950s, but one was commissioned in 1998.

Background
Mateo Manaure won the National Prize for Plastic Arts for young artists in 1947, shortly after completing his studies at the Caracas School of Arts. His prize was a trip to Paris. He took his classmate  with him, and they met other Venezuelan artists, founding Los disidentes. In 1952 Manaure and  opened the Galería Cuatro Muros in Caracas, showcasing the designs and style of many of the artists involved with the University City of Caracas project, as well as continuing the work of the Los disidentes magazine. It was the first time abstract art was displayed in Venezuela.

Between 1952 and 1954, Manaure worked intensely in collaboration with architect Carlos Raúl Villanueva, who was in charge of the campus project. The majority of the murals on the campus were designed by Manaure, and he was the artist with the greatest number of works in it. Manaure was also the artwork supervisor of the project.

Style
As part of Los disidentes, Manaure – whose formal training was in traditional art styles – developed mural design techniques to incorporate art with urban design. He felt that the group, having experienced and learnt from art of other cultures and new developments in modernism, had a responsibility to develop a national art with these sensibilities. Working in art for urbanism, a growing trend in the 1950s in Latin America due to new advances in both fields, Manaure experimented with repeated geometric shapes "in search of his own style and [with] attention to [...] functionality." He was also concerned with color, saying in later life:

According to the Durban Segnini Gallery, reflecting on Manaure's life work in 2013, the works he produced for the campus "belong to a creative cycle supported by strong geometric abstraction with well-defined edges and solid-colored planes, known during his [career] as "geometric mural painting"." Manaure studied Villanueva's principles of the Synthesis of the Arts, with a focus on how his murals would fit in their place; the various designs of the murals were planned to enhance the architectural planes of the university, as well as differentiating the functions of different spaces. The Durban Segnini Gallery also notes that Manaure's murals are harmonic with murals by other artists contributing to the project.

Murals

Olympic Stadium murals
The artwork of the Olympic Stadium was the second phase of Villanueva's campus design. Their designs also embodied the Synthesis of the Arts. As with many of the murals, they were paintings transferred to sheets of ceramic tiles.

Plaza Cubierta murals
Manaure's mural on the exterior of the curved Sala de Conciertos – in yellow, blue, black, and red – was said by Venezuelan heritage historian Mayerling Lopez to be an inventive response to the architectural restrictions, one that also created dynamism by combining horizontal stripes within vertical stripes, and the other way around. It covers the east facade of the hall and measures . This mural and the one on the north face of the Paraninfo were both installed by Caracas ceramics firm Llamart CA in 1954 and reconstructed by Cerámicas Carabobo in 1985. The Paraninfo mural, a white background with quadrilateral shapes in red, yellow, green, and blue, with dark line patterns, measures .

Another of Manaure's murals lies by the entrance of the Sala de Conciertos within the Plaza Cubierta, parallel to the Victor Vasarely mural Positive – Negative. This red, white, black and blue mural measures . Other Manaure murals, the bimural and curved mural, are described by the Durban Segnini Gallery as two of the most important. The curved mural measures  around.

Hospital murals
On the far south wall of the seventh floor terrace of the University Hospital is a large mural by Manaure, featuring simple geometric shapes in different colors; seven similar murals adorn the hospital lobby, and Manaure designed the hospital facade. In addition, he created ventilation elements of the hospital lobby.

Faculty of Engineering murals

La pared de ciencias

Year: 1955

The former Escuela Técnica Industrial (Technical College) is located in the southwest of the campus and was designed by Villanueva as a separate but connected institution between 1946 and 1949. It has since been integrated into the university and is home to the Faculty of Sciences. The mural known as La pared de ciencias was constructed in 1955, at the request of the government, and is located on a wall of the former Technical College. It was described by architecture scholar Sibyl Moholy-Nagy as "obsolete" and "brash"; she noted that when people visited the campus with Villanueva, he would "turn away with a pained expression". According to Moholy-Nagy, Villanueva himself said that it is "too loud, too coarse, unrelated and unproportioned to the building".

Taller Galia murals

Other works

Acoustic frames
In the Sala de Conciertos are two 1954 frames, on each side of the stage, to complement the acoustics of the hall. They are wooden and designed with slats that have colored stripes in the opposite direction.

Stained-glass windows
Manaure designed two large stained-glass windows for the Paraninfo performance hall. They depict quadrilateral geometric shapes of different sizes in various colors. The window on the south facade measures , and the window on the east facade measures .

Construcción cromática
Construcción cromática was constructed in 1998 in the Facultad de Ciencias Económicas y Sociales (Faculty of Economic and Social Sciences; FaCES). It is different in style to Manaure's architectural artworks.

See also
List of artworks in University City of Caracas

Notes

References

External links
Complete guide to the University City World Heritage Site
University City Artwork Map of the Cultural Center
University City Artwork Map of the Hospital Complex
University City Artwork Map of the campus east side

Manaure, Mateo, University City of Caracas
Ciudad Universitaria de Caracas